The Headmaster is a 1921 British silent comedy-drama film directed by Kenelm Foss and starring Cyril Maude, Margot Drake and Miles Malleson. It is based on the 1913 play The Headmaster by Edward Knoblock and Wilfred Coleby. The film can be summarized as a clergyman working as the headmaster of a school tries to persuade his daughter to marry the idiotic son of an influential figure in the hope of being promoted to bishop.

Cast
 Cyril Maude as Rev. Cuthbert Sanctuary  
 Margot Drake as Portia Sanctuary  
 Miles Malleson as Palliser Grantley  
 Marie Illington as Cornelia Grantley  
 Lionelle Howard as Jack Strahan 
 Simeon Stuart as Dean of Carchester  
 Ann Trevor as Antigone Sanctuary  
 Louie Freear as Bella  
 Will Corrie as Sgt. Munton  
 Alan Selby as Richards  
 Gordon Craig as Stuart Minor

References

Bibliography
 Low, Rachael. History of the British Film, 1918-1929. George Allen & Unwin, 1971.

External links

1921 films
1921 comedy-drama films
British silent feature films
British comedy-drama films
Films directed by Kenelm Foss
British films based on plays
Films set in England
British black-and-white films
1920s English-language films
1920s British films
Silent comedy-drama films